Eugen Gura (8 November 184226 August 1906)  was a German operatic baritone.

Life

Gura was born in Nové Sedlo, Louny District, Bohemia (now in the Czech Republic).

He was at first educated for the career of a painter at Vienna and Munich; but later, developing a fine baritone voice, he took up singing and studied it at the Munich Conservatorium. In 1865, he made his debut at the Munich opera, and in the following years he gained the highest reputation in Germany, being engaged principally at Leipzig till 1876 and then at Hamburg until 1883.

He sang in 1876 in Wagner's Ring at Bayreuth, and was famous for his Wagnerian roles; his Hans Sachs in Die Meistersinger von Nürnberg, as performed in London in 1882, was magnificent. He created the role of Gűnther in Wagner's Götterdämmerung on 17 August 1876.

In later years, he showed the perfection of art in his singing of German Lieder. His sons were actor and singer Hermann Gura and actor Eugen Gura Jr., and his granddaughter was actress Sascha Gura. He died in Aufkirchen, Bavaria.

References

Attribution:

1842 births
1906 deaths
People from Louny District
German operatic baritones
19th-century German male opera singers
German Bohemian people